Manfreda was a genus of flowering plants in the family Asparagaceae, subfamily Agavoideae. Along with Polianthes, members are commonly called tuberoses. The generic name honours 14th-century Italian writer Manfredus de Monte Imperiale. All species are now placed in Agave. (See Agave § Taxonomy.)

Like other species of Agave, former Manfreda species have rosettes of leaves branching from a very short stem, and flowers at the end of a long stalk. The flowers are tubular and whitish, yellow, green, or brownish, with lengthy stamens.

Species
Species formerly placed in Manfreda:

Manfreda alibertii (Baker) Rose = Agave virginica
Manfreda brachystachys (Cav.) Rose = Agave scabra
Manfreda brunnea (S.Watson) Rose = Agave brunnea
Manfreda bulbulifera Castillejos & E.Solano = Agave bulbulifera
Manfreda chamelensis E.J.Lott & Verh.-Will. = Agave chamelensis
Manfreda conduplicata (Jacobi & C.D.Bouché) Rose = Agave virginica
Manfreda elongata Rose = Agave gracillima
Manfreda fusca Ravenna = Agave fusca
Manfreda galvaniae A.Castañeda = Agave galvaniae
Manfreda guerrerensis Matuda = Agave guerrerensis
Manfreda guttata (Jacobi & C.D.Bouché) Rose = Agave guttata
Manfreda hauniensis (J.B.Petersen) Verh.-Will. = Agave hauniensis
Manfreda insignis Matuda = Agave hauniensis
Manfreda involuta McVaugh = Agave involuta
Manfreda jaliscana Rose = Agave jaliscana
Manfreda justosierrana García-Mend. = Agave justosierrana
Manfreda littoralis García-Mend. = Agave littoralis
Manfreda longibracteata Verh.-Will. = Agave longibracteata
Manfreda longiflora (Rose) Verh.-Will. = Agave longiflora
Manfreda maculata (Mart.) Rose = Agave stictata
Manfreda maculosa (Hook.) Rose = Agave maculata
Manfreda malinaltenangensis Matuda = Agave scabra
Manfreda nanchititlensis Matuda = Agave nanchititlensis
Manfreda oliveriana Rose = Agave scabra
Manfreda paniculata L.Hern. = Agave paniculata
Manfreda parva Aarón Rodr. = Agave parva
Manfreda petskinil R.A.Orellana = Agave petskinil
Manfreda planifolia (S.Watson) Rose = Agave planifolia
Manfreda potosina (B.L.Rob. & Greenm.) Rose = Agave potosina
Manfreda pringlei Rose = Agave debilis
Manfreda pubescens (Regel & Ortgies) Verh.-Will. ex Espejo & López-Ferr. = Agave pubescens
Manfreda revoluta (Klotzsch) Rose = Agave revoluta
Manfreda rubescens Rose = Agave pratensis
Manfreda scabra (Ortega) McVaugh = Agave scabra
Manfreda sessiliflora (Hemsl.) Matuda = Agave scabra
Manfreda sileri Verh.-Will. = Agave sileri
Manfreda singuliflora (S.Watson) Rose = Agave singuliflora
Manfreda tamazunchalensis Matuda = Agave variegata
Manfreda tigrina (Engelm.) Small = Agave virginica
Manfreda umbrophila García-Mend. = Agave umbrophila
Manfreda undulata (Klotzsch) Rose = Agave undulata
Manfreda variegata (Jacobi) Rose = Agave variegata
Manfreda verhoekiae García-Mend. = Agave verhoekiae
Manfreda virginica (L.) Salisb. ex Rose = Agave virginica
Manfreda xilitlensis Matuda = Agave variegata

References

External links 

 Pacific Bulb Society wiki page on Manfreda

Historically recognized angiosperm genera
Agavoideae